Maurie Ignatius Collins (21 July 1876 – 8 November 1943) was an Australian rules footballer who played for Essendon in the Victorian Football League (VFL).

Collins played his early football at both Albert Park and Xavier College. He was injured during the 1897 VFL finals series but according to some sources made one appearance. Collins, a defender, was a member of Essendon's 1901 premiership team, as a back pocket. A VFL representative, he was the vice captain of Essendon for his final season.

At the end of the 1899 season, in the process of naming his own "champion player", the football correspondent for The Argus ("Old Boy"), selected a team of the best players of the 1899 VFL competition:Backs: Maurie Collins (Essendon), Bill Proudfoot (Collingwood), Peter Burns (Geelong); Halfbacks: Pat Hickey (Fitzroy), George Davidson (South Melbourne), Alf Wood (Melbourne); Centres: Fred Leach (Collingwood), Firth McCallum (Geelong), Harry Wright (Essendon); Wings: Charlie Pannam (Collingwood), Eddie Drohan (Fitzroy), Herb Howson (South Melbourne); Forwards: Bill Jackson (Essendon), Eddy James (Geelong), Charlie Colgan (South Melbourne); Ruck: Mick Pleass (South Melbourne), Frank Hailwood (Collingwood), Joe McShane (Geelong); Rovers: Dick Condon (Collingwood), Bill McSpeerin (Fitzroy), Teddy Rankin (Geelong).From those he considered to be the three best players – that is, Condon, Hickey, and Pleass – he selected Pat Hickey as his "champion player" of the season. ('Old Boy', "Football: A Review of the Season", (Monday, 18 September 1899), p.6).

Notes

References

Holmesby, Russell and Main, Jim (2007). The Encyclopedia of AFL Footballers. 7th ed. Melbourne: Bas Publishing.

1876 births
1943 deaths
Essendon Football Club players
Essendon Football Club Premiership players
Australian rules footballers from Melbourne
People educated at Xavier College
One-time VFL/AFL Premiership players
People from Clifton Hill, Victoria